Semidevilish is the fourth album by the Polish symphonic black metal band Darzamat which was released in 2004. This album features new female singer Nera.

Track listing
 "Intro" - 2:50	
 "In Red Iris" - 4:33
 "Era Aggression" - 4:01
 "Time Of Obscure Emotions" - 5:02
 "Fistful Of Ashes" - 5:06
 "Demise" - 4:18
 "Absence Of Light" - 4:25
 "The Darkest One" - 3:41
 "Dusk" - 6:01
 "From Beyond" - 4:56
 "In Its Cobweb" - 4:45

Total playtime: 49:38 minutes.

Notes
  An enhanced audio disc was released under Metal Mind Productions containing a video of the song Era Aggression which could be viewed if one were to insert the disc into the computer. The video was recorded at the 9th edition of the Brutal Assault Festival, where Darzamat played in August that same year.

Personnel
 Agnieszka "Nera" Górecka - vocals
 Rafał "Flauros" Góral - vocals
 Damian "Daamr" Kowalski - electric guitar, bass guitar
 Krzysztof "Chris" Michalak - electric guitar
 Patryk "Spectre" Kumór - keyboard instruments
 Tomasz "Golem" Dańczak - drums

External links
 Encyclopaedia Metallum (retrieved 10-17-08)
 Semidevilish Review at Deadwebzine

2004 albums
Darzamat albums
Metal Mind Productions albums